The second season of the stop-motion television series Robot Chicken originally aired in the United States on Cartoon Network's late night programming block, Adult Swim. Season two officially began on April 2, 2006 on Adult Swim, with "Suck It", and ended with "Book of Corrine" on November 19, 2006, with a total of twenty episodes.

The second season was released on the Season Two: Uncensored DVD on September 4, 2007 in Region 1, September 28, 2009 in Region 2 and November 11, 2007 in Region 4.

Overview 
The second season of Robot Chicken includes many TV, movie, TV commercial, and pop culture parodies, and non-sequitur blackouts, all acted out by dolls and action figures, including parodies such as: Mexico builds its greatest hero in "The Six Million Peso Man", a time-traveler wreaks havoc on history in "Dicks with Time Machines", Fred and Barney brawl over a box of Fruity Pebbles, Lindsay Lohan enters the world of Highlander and battles (and decapitates) teen starlet foes, such as Amanda Bynes and Hilary Duff, a cleaning woman finds the Batcave the hard way, popular board games from Chutes and Ladders to Hungry Hungry Hippos get turned into action-packed feature films, A checkers champion goes on the adventure of a lifetime, the Senior Mutant Ninja Turtles rock the nursing home, monkeys explore outer space on a budget, the Care Bears care a lot...about ethnic cleansing, the Fantanas visit the Middle East peace Process, the legendary Krakken sea monster learns freedom isn't all it's "krak-ed" up to be, young Indiana Jones finds treasure in his elementary school, the classic movie The Beastmaster takes Broadway by storm, the Library of Heaven yields answers even God doesn't want you to know, Orlando Bloom must help his fellow passengers survive after a plane crash, Snow Job finds his specialized skills aren't in high demand with G.I. Joe, Mario and Luigi stumble into the violent world of "Grand Theft Auto", Stretch Armstrong needs a corn syrup transplant, and the cast of Sesame Street deals with a viral outbreak when Big Bird catches the bird flu.

Guest stars 
Many celebrities have guest starred in Robot Chicken season two they include, Sarah Michelle Gellar, Mila Kunis, Rachael Leigh Cook, Christian Slater, Corey Feldman, Macaulay Culkin, Jimmy Kimmel, Emma Caulfield, Michelle Trachtenberg, "Weird Al" Yankovic, Paul Rudd, Jamie Kaler, Corey Haim, Phyllis Diller, Ginnifer Goodwin, Abraham Benrubi, Bruce Campbell, Hal Sparks, Scott Adsit, Miguel Ferrer, Michael Ian Black, Rick Schroeder, James Van Der Beek, Hulk Hogan, Melanie Griffith, Cree Summer, Wayne Brady, Nick Simmons, Sarah Silverman, Kelly Hu, Josh Cooke, Gene Simmons, Alfonso Freeman, David Hasselhoff, Scarlett Johansson, Alan Cumming, Elijah Wood, Bridget Marquardt, Kendra Wilkinson, Holly Madison, Hugh Hefner, Eugene Byrd, Candace Bailey, Dr. Drew Pinsky and Charlize Theron.

Episodes

DVD release

References 

2006 American television seasons
Robot Chicken seasons